Domingo de Salazar (1512 – 4 December 1594) was a Catholic prelate who served as the first Bishop of Manila (1579–94) which was then newly-annexed to the Spanish Empire.

Biography
He was born in La Rioja, Spain. At the age of 15, his family sent him to study at the University of Salamanca, wherein the university was the most important cultural and intellectual center of Spain and one of the famous in the entire European continent. At the University of Salamanca, Salazar was profoundly influenced by the philosopher and theologian Francisco de Vitoria, wherein many of the solutions that Salazar tried to offer when it came to the theological and juridicial problems in the Philippines, were inspired by Vitoria. He obtained his bachelor's degree in Canon Law in the year 1532 and afterwards obtained his Bachelor of Civil Laws in 1539. There were no concrete evidence to point the idea that Salazar actually enrolled in the classes taught by Vitoria, but he supported the cause of Vitoria, the humanitarian and Christian ideas with regards to the conquest and evangelization of the Americas.

Salazar was also involved in the Spanish expedition in modern-day US state, Florida from 1558 until 1561. After leaving Mexico City to Florida, Salazar along with Pedro de Feria and Domingo de la Anuciacion wrote a letter to King Philip II that all laws enacted for the new discoveries and conquest had to be fulfilled by the participants in the expedition so that abuses against the natives would be avoided and there must be enough provisions that should be given to the expeditionaries for at least a period of time, so that robberies against the locals would be avoided.

On 6 February 1579, he was selected by the King of Spain and confirmed by Pope Gregory XIII as the first Bishop of Manila. He was installed in 1581. He strongly opposed enslaving the indigenous people of the Philippines. He served as Bishop of Manila until his death on 4 December 1594, aged 82.

References

External links and additional sources
 (for Chronology of Bishops) 
 (for Chronology of Bishops) 
Domingo de Salazar profile, newadvent.org; accessed 12 October 2016.

1512 births
1594 deaths
16th-century Roman Catholic bishops in the Philippines
Spanish expatriates in the Philippines
Bishops appointed by Pope Gregory XIII

Roman Catholic Archdiocese of Manila